David Alan Washburn is an American psychologist and professor emeritus of psychology and neuroscience at Georgia State University. From 2001 to 2019, he also served as the Director of the Georgia State University Language Research Center. In August, 2019, he retired at Georgia State University and joined the faculty of his alma mater as professor of psychology at Covenant College. His research includes studies of individual and group (including primate species) differences in cognitive competencies, particularly attention and its relation to learning, memory, and executive functioning. He is best known for his noninvasive behavioral and cognitive research with monkeys, using game-like computerized tasks.

Professional affiliations
Professor Washburn is a Fellow and former President of the American Psychological Association's Society for Experimental Psychology and Cognitive Science (APA Division 3) and Society for Behavioral Neuroscience and Comparative Psychology (APA Division 6). He is also a fellow of the Association for Psychological Science and the Psychonomic Society. He was also elected to terms as president and other offices of the Society for Computers in Psychology, the Southern Society for Philosophy and Psychology, and the Southeastern Psychological Association. He co-authored (with Duane M. Rumbaugh) The Intelligence of Apes and Other Rational Beings (Yale University Press, 2003) and edited Primate Perspectives on Behavior and Cognition (American Psychological Association, 2007).

References

External links
Faculty page
Curriculum Vitae

Living people
21st-century American psychologists
Georgia State University faculty
Georgia State University alumni
Fellows of the American Psychological Association
Fellows of the Association for Psychological Science
Experimental psychologists
Year of birth missing (living people)